ELMO domain containing 2 is a protein that in humans is encoded by the ELMOD2 gene.

Function

This gene encodes one of six engulfment and motility (ELMO) domain-containing proteins. This gene is thought to play a role in antiviral responses. Mutations in this gene may be involved in the cause of familial idiopathic pulmonary fibrosis.

References

Further reading